Speerschneidera is a single-species genus of lichen-forming fungi in the family Leprocaulaceae. The genus was circumscribed by Italian botanist Vittore Benedetto Antonio Trevisan de Saint-Léon in 1861, with Speerschneidera euploca as the type species. This lichen was originally described by Edward Tuckerman in 1858 as Physcia euploca. It is a crustose lichen found in the southern United States and Mexico.

He worked as a curator of Frederick Charles, Prince of Schwarzburg-Rudolstadt's natural history collection which later became the Natural History Museum in Rudolstadt.

References

Lecanoromycetes
Lichen genera
Monotypic Lecanorales genera
Taxa described in 1861
Taxa named by Vittore Benedetto Antonio Trevisan de Saint-Léon
Fungi without expected TNC conservation status